In logic, the semantics of logic or formal semantics is the study of the semantics, or interpretations, of formal and (idealizations of) natural languages usually trying to capture the pre-theoretic notion of entailment.

Overview
The truth conditions of various sentences we may encounter in arguments will depend upon their meaning, and so logicians cannot completely avoid the need to provide some treatment of the meaning of these sentences.  The semantics of logic refers to the approaches that logicians have introduced to understand and determine that part of meaning in which they are interested; the logician traditionally is not interested in the sentence as uttered but in the proposition, an idealised sentence suitable for logical manipulation.

Until the advent of modern logic, Aristotle's Organon, especially De Interpretatione, provided the basis for understanding the significance of logic.  The introduction of quantification, needed to solve the problem of multiple generality, rendered impossible the kind of subject–predicate analysis that governed Aristotle's account, although there is a renewed interest in term logic, attempting to find calculi in the spirit of Aristotle's syllogisms, but with the generality of modern logics based on the quantifier.

The main modern approaches to semantics for formal languages are the following:
 The archetype of model-theoretic semantics is Alfred Tarski's semantic theory of truth, based on his T-schema, and is one of the founding concepts of model theory.  This is the most widespread approach, and is based on the idea that the meaning of the various parts of the propositions are given by the possible ways we can give a recursively specified group of interpretation functions from them to some predefined mathematical domains: an interpretation of first-order predicate logic is given by a mapping from terms to a universe of individuals, and a mapping from propositions to the truth values "true" and "false".  Model-theoretic semantics provides the foundations for an approach to the theory of meaning known as truth-conditional semantics, which was pioneered by Donald Davidson.  Kripke semantics introduces innovations, but is broadly in the Tarskian mold.
 Proof-theoretic semantics associates the meaning of propositions with the roles that they can play in inferences. Gerhard Gentzen, Dag Prawitz and Michael Dummett are generally seen as the founders of this approach; it is heavily influenced by Ludwig Wittgenstein's later philosophy, especially his aphorism "meaning is use".
 Truth-value semantics (also commonly referred to as substitutional quantification) was advocated by Ruth Barcan Marcus for modal logics in the early 1960s and later championed by J. Michael Dunn, Nuel Belnap, and Hugues Leblanc for standard first-order logic. James Garson has given some results in the areas of adequacy for intensional logics outfitted with such a semantics. The truth conditions for quantified formulas are given purely in terms of truth with no appeal to domains whatsoever (and hence its name truth-value semantics).
 Game semantics or game-theoretical semantics made a resurgence mainly due to Jaakko Hintikka for logics of (finite) partially ordered quantification, which were originally investigated by Leon Henkin, who studied Henkin quantifiers.
 Probabilistic semantics originated from Hartry Field and has been shown equivalent to and a natural generalization of truth-value semantics. Like truth-value semantics, it is also non-referential in nature.

See also

Algebraic semantics
Formal semantics (natural language)

References
 Jaakko Hintikka (2007), Socratic Epistemology: Explorations of Knowledge-Seeking by Questioning, Cambridge: Cambridge University Press.
 Ilkka Niiniluoto (1999), Critical Scientific Realism, Oxford: Oxford University Press.

Mathematical logic
Model theory
Philosophy of language
Semantics
Theories of deduction
Theories of truth